Senekal Commando was a light infantry regiment of the South African Army. It formed part of the South African Army Infantry Formation as well as the South African Territorial Reserve.

History

Origin
This unit started as a subunit of the Winburg Commando around 1900.

Operations

With the Orange Free State Republic
After the battle of Paardekraal, the Senekal Commando joined up with General de Wet. On 4 April 1900, they defeated a British column near Mostertshoek. This was followed by a siege of Brabant`s Horse at Jammersberg.

The last major battle was at Biddulphsberg on 29 May 1900 when this commando took positions in the mountains between Senekal to Ficksburg.

With the UDF
By 1902 all Commando remnants were under British military control and disarmed.

By 1912, however previous Commando members could join shooting associations.

By 1940, such commandos were under control of the National Reserve of Volunteers.

These commandos were formally reactivated by 1948.

Under the SADF
In this era, the commando was utilised primarily for area force protection.

This unit fell under the command of Group 36.

With the SANDF

Disbandment
This unit, along with all other Commando units was disbanded after a decision by South African President Thabo Mbeki to disband all Commando Units. The Commando system was phased out between 2003 and 2008 "because of the role it played in the apartheid era", according to the Minister of Safety and Security Charles Nqakula.

Unit Insignia

Leadership 

 Kommandant J.J. Human 1973

See also 

 South African Commando System

References

Infantry regiments of South Africa
South African Commando Units
Military units and formations of the Second Boer War